Brodiaea , also known by the common name cluster-lilies, is a monocot genus of flowering plants.

One school of thought places the genus in the family , while another school of thought places it in the subfamily Brodiaeoideae of the family Asparagaceae.  The USDA Plants Database still classifies the genus Brodiaea in the family Liliaceae.

Brodiaea species occur along the Pacific Coast region of North America, from British Columbia throughout California into the Baja California Peninsula. They are especially common in northern California.

Description
Brodiaea species are herbaceous perennials, growing from corms. Between one and six narrow leaves are produced from the corm. The bare flowering stem (scape) carries an umbel of flowers. Individual flowers have six blue to purple tepals, joined at the base to form a tube with free lobes at the mouth. The outer three tepal lobes are narrower than the inner three.

In almost all species, inside the tepals and joined to their bases are three sterile stamens (staminodes), resembling small petals, each opposite one of the outer tepals. Three normal stamens are also joined to the bases of the tepals and are placed opposite the inner ones. The base of the filaments of the stamens may be expanded into various shapes, such as flaps or wings. The size and shape of the staminodes and of the structures at the base of the filaments are important diagnostic characters. The compound pistil is formed of three carpels forming a superior ovary with three locules. The style which emerges between the three stamens has a three-lobed stigma. The seeds are black.

Taxonomy

Nomenclature
The origin of the scientific name of the genus is somewhat tangled. Specimens of what is now called Brodiaea were first collected by Archibald Menzies, botanist to the Vancouver Expedition, in 1792. Menzies collected the plant from the vicinity of the Strait of Georgia, named "New Georgia" by George Vancouver. The first published reference to the plant did not give it a name. This was in James Edward Smith's 1807 An introduction to physiological and systematical botany, where Smith used it to argue that the tepals of liliaceous plants are sepals rather than petals: 

The following year, early in 1808, Richard Salisbury published a description of the first Brodiaea species in The Paradisus Londinensis, naming it Hookera coronaria, the genus name being in honour of the illustrator William Hooker. Shortly afterwards, Smith named a moss genus Hookeria, and in April 1808, he read to the Linnean Society of London a formal description of a new genus, based on the same species as Salisbury's Hookera coronaria, naming the genus Brodiaea in honour of Scottish botanist James Brodie. Formal publication did not occur, however, until Smith's presentation went to print in 1810. George Boulger, writing in the Dictionary of National Biography, says that Smith's actions were deliberately intended to deprive Salisbury of credit for the genus.

If this was Smith's intention it was successful, since although Salisbury's genus name Hookera has priority over Smith's name Brodiaea, names as similar as Hookera and Hookeria are considered to be confusing and a formal proposal to conserve the names Brodiaea and Hookeria over the name Hookera was accepted. Brodiaea is thus a "conserved name" or "nomen conservandum", shown by the abbreviation "nom. cons." after the name in botanical sources. The type species is now Brodiaea coronaria, and the original type, Brodiaea grandiflora Sm., is an illegitimate name.

Phylogeny and classification
Brodiaea belongs to a group of 12 genera whose affinities were the subject of much controversy until the end of the 20th century. Salisbury treated them as a family which he named Themidaceae. Others placed this group at lower taxonomic rank and usually included them in Liliaceae, Alliaceae, or Amaryllidaceae. Molecular phylogenetic studies confirmed the suspicions of many that this group was misplaced, and consequently, the family Themidaceae was resurrected in 1996. When the Angiosperm Phylogeny Group published the APG II system in 2003, Themidaceae was accepted as an optional family for those who wanted to circumscribe families narrowly in the order Asparagales. When the APG III system was published in 2009, the former Themidaceae was treated as a subfamily, Brodiaeoideae, of the family Asparagaceae sensu lato.

Some sources, such as ITIS, continue to use the polyphyletic groups of obsolete taxonomic systems. Other sources, such as the Angiosperm Phylogeny Website mostly follow the Angiosperm Phylogeny Group.

Brodiaea (or brodeia) is also used as a common name to refer to three genera, Brodiaea, Dichelostemma, and Triteleia.  The latter two genera were once included as part of the genus Brodiaea.
The monophyly of Brodiaea as presently defined is not entirely certain. It might be intermixed with Dichelostemma.

Species
, the World Checklist of Selected Plant Families lists the following 17 species.  English common names are from the Flora of North America.

 Brodiaea appendiculata Hoover - appendage cluster-lily - central California
 Brodiaea californica Lindl. ex Lem. - California cluster-lily - northern California, southwestern Oregon
 Brodiaea coronaria (Salisb.) Jeps. - harvest cluster-lily; Californian hyacinth - British Columbia, Washington, Oregon, much of California
 Brodiaea elegans Hoover - elegant cluster-lily - western Oregon, most of California
 Brodiaea filifolia S.Watson - threadleaf cluster-lily - southern California
 Brodiaea insignis (Jeps.) Niehaus  - Kaweah cluster-lily - Tulare County
 Brodiaea jolonensis Eastw. - chaparral cluster-lily - southern California, northern Baja California
 Brodiaea kinkiensis Niehaus - San Clemente Island cluster-lily - San Clemente Island
 Brodiaea matsonii R.E.Preston - Shasta County
 Brodiaea minor (Benth.) S.Watson (syn. Brodiaea purdyi Eastw.) - vernalpool cluster-lily - northern California 
 Brodiaea nana Hoover - northern California 
 Brodiaea orcuttii (Greene) Baker - Orcutt's cluster-lily - southern California, northern Baja California
 Brodiaea pallida Hoover - Chinese Camp cluster-lily - Calaveras and Tuolumne Counties
 Brodiaea santarosae T.J.Chester - Santa Rosa basalt brodiaea - Riverside and San Diego Counties
 Brodiaea sierrae R.E.Preston  - Butte, Yuba and Nevada Counties
 Brodiaea stellaris S.Watson - starflower cluster-lily - Sonoma, Mendocino and Humboldt Counties
 Brodiaea terrestris Kellogg - dwarf cluster-lily - southwestern Oregon and much of coastal and southern California

formerly included
Numerous other names have been coined using the name Brodiaea, referring to species now regarded as better suited to other genera (Androstephium Beauverdia Dandya Dichelostemma Leucocoryne Nothoscordum Tristagma Triteleia Triteleiopsis).

Distribution and habitat
Brodiaea species are confined to western North America, from British Columbia in the north, through the West Coast of the United States region, to northwestern Mexico in the south. The majority of species are endemic to California.

Many are adapted to serpentine soils or other soils with particular chemical compositions, resulting in limited distributions and several rare and endangered species. An example is Brodiaea pallida, known only from two populations along the border between Tuolumne County and Calaveras County, California.

Cultivation
A number of species of Brodiaea are in cultivation. Species such as B. californica and B. coronaria are recommended for sunny positions in the garden, where they extend the flowering season of most ornamental bulbs, flowering in early summer rather than in spring. The flower heads (umbels) of larger species can be dried for use as winter decorations. Smaller species, such as B. terrestris, may be grown in a bulb frame or alpine house.

References

Bibliography

External links

 Calflora Database: Brodiaea species
Jepson Manual eFlora (TJM2) treatment of Brodiaea
USDA Plants Profile for Brodiaea species (brodiaea)

 
Asparagaceae genera
Flora of California